Charles Geoffrey "Geoff" Corkish MBE MLC (born 25 May 1953) is a Manx politician, who is currently a Member of the House of Keys for Douglas West.   He was elected at the 2006 General Election, topping the polls beating Home Affairs Minister and Chief Minister candidate John Shimmin and former MHK Geoff Cannell.

Mr Corkish has stated his opposition to social media and a belief that forums that do not support the Manx Government should be banned.

Early life
Born on 25 May 1953 to William Douglas Corkish and Margaret Elizabeth Corkish (née Cringle), he was educated at Pulrose Infants School, Demesne Road School and Douglas High School for Boys. He later went on to work for the Isle of Man Steam Packet Company from 1969 to 2006, rising to be Communications Director. He is also the Chairman of the Arts Council and his interests include singing. He was awarded an MBE in the 2007 New Year's Honours.

He is currently a member of the Department of Tourism and Leisure and the Department of Trade and Industry.

He was elevated to the Legislative Council, after having been elected on 18 May 2013 in the first round.

Mr Corkish is now retired as of February 2018

Personal life
Corkish has been married to Muriel (née Curphy) since 1976, they have 2 children together and has 1 granddaughter. Corkish also holds freemasonry membership.

References

Members of the House of Keys 2006–2011
Members of the House of Keys 2011–2016
Manx people
Living people
Members of the Order of the British Empire
1953 births